Beynes may refer to:

 Beynes, Alpes-de-Haute-Provence – a commune in the Alpes-de-Haute-Provence department of France.
 Beynes, Yvelines – a commune in the Yvelines department of France.